Atomhenge 76 is a 2000 live album release of part of a 1976 concert by Hawkwind.

Part of this set was previously issued in North America on a single CD as Thrilling Hawkwind Adventures (Griffin Music, November–1999, GCD8402).

Track listing
CD1
"Intro" (Hawkwind) – 1:18
"Reefer Madness" (Calvert, Brock) – 6:05
"Paradox" (Brock) – 4:23
"Chronoglide Skyway" (House) – 5:56
"Hassan-i-Sabah" [aka "Assassins of Allah"] (Calvert, Rudolph) – 5:56
"Brainstorm" (Turner) – 8:53
"Wind of Change" (Brock) – 4:09
CD2
"Instrumental" (Hawkwind) – 1:15
"Steppenwolf" (Calvert, Brock) – 11:14
"Uncle Sam's on Mars" (Calvert, Powell, King) – 7:36
"Time For Sale" (Calvert, Rudolph) – 10:38
"Back on the Streets" (Calvert, Rudolph) – 5:16
"Sonic Attack" (Michael Moorcock, Hawkwind) – 6:27
"Kerb Crawler" (Calvert, Brock) – 5:34
Thrilling Hawkwind Adventures version
"Brainstorm" (Turner) – 9:23
"Wind of Change" (Brock) – 4:31
"Steppenwolf" (Calvert, Brock) – 11:17
"Uncle Sam's on Mars" (Calvert, Powell, King) – 6:56
"Time for Sale" (Calvert, Rudolph) – 10:13
"Back on the Streets" (Calvert, Rudolph) – 4:40
"Sonic Attack" (Moorcock, Hawkwind) – 6:01

Personnel
Hawkwind
Robert Calvert – vocals
Dave Brock – guitar, vocals
Nik Turner – saxophone, flute, vocals
Paul Rudolph – bass guitar, guitar
Simon House – violin, keyboards
Simon King – drums
Alan Powell – drums

References

Hawkwind live albums
2000 live albums